Lobo (born 19 November 1973) is a Brazilian painter of Pop Art. He has already painted artworks for personalities such as Luciano Huck, Angélica, Sabrina Sato, and Michel Teló, among others. He has also participated in projects together with companies such as Heineken, Mercado Livre, and Viva Schin, among others.

Biographical overview 
Lobo was born on 19 November 1973. He has initiated his career in 1991, working at an Advertising agency where he started to develop skills in Packaging and labeling and Merchandising. From an early age, he became interested in the visual arts.

In high school, used to make artworks for exercise book covers for his friends and in his teens, he designed t-shirts arts for some brands.

 
Working with advertising from 1991 on, after spending twelve years working with Publicity, in 2003 he finally discovered his talent for Painting. A few years later, maturing his style, he decided to get slightly away from his roots (mainly inspired by Keith Haring and Andy Warhol) to develop his own language.

Career 
Lobo's work is linked to his experience in observing everything that surrounds him, from elements of the Culture of Brazil, Folklore, nature and aspects of the culture of the countries he visits.

At the beginning of his career, the artist signed as Lobao; later he took Lobo as his stage name. He portrayed icons of Pop Culture, and his paintings evolved over time.

Lobo started painting in 2003 and made his first exhibition at the Piola restaurant in São Paulo.

In 2006, the artist who still signed as Lobao, accompanied the Rock Band  Jota Quest on its tour, Até Onde Vai, with an exhibition of works that depict music, clips and scenes from the Minas Gerais band.

In 2008, the Brazilian version of Rolling Stone celebrated two years of activities in the country, with a party with the theme “Attitude that changes the world”. To illustrate the theme, the magazine invited the artist, who made an exhibition where he portrayed some covers of the magazine and people who somehow changed the world, such as Ayrton Senna, Elvis Presley, Paulo Coelho, and Bob Marley among others.

In 2009 he took part in an exhibition at Casa Cor São Paulo, the artist contributed to this project with two canvases inspired by Burle Marx's work and traces and also counts on his art on the bathroom doors, where in mosaic formats he shows the face of the landscape artist.

In 2010, he created a mural for the Bookstore of Livraria Saraiva, highlighting the Brazilian writer Clarice Lispector, the poet Pablo Neruda and the writer Jorge Amado.

In 2011 he was invited to participate in the Brazilian Festival in Amsterdam in the Netherlands. Held at the luxurious Mint Hotel, the exhibition “Sambadam” integrating cultural elements from the Netherlands and Brazil, the artist Lobo portrayed icons from both cultures such as Pelé, Carmen Miranda, Anne Frank (who he spent most of his life in Amsterdam), Caipirinha and the bicycles that are the most popular form of transport in the Netherlands.

In 2013 he participated in the M - exhibition from Marilyn Monroe to Madonna. The artist portrayed the two blondes in two paintings that pay homage to these two women who are recognized in the world. Madonna is recognized as the most successful musical artist by the Guinness World Records and Marilyn Monroe is an icon of the Culture of the United States according to The Guide to United States Popular Culture. Part of the income collected at the exhibition was donated to the NGO Banco de Alimentos, which fights hunger and food waste.

In 2013, Lobo was invited by Gillette to participate in the launch of razors in honor of the Brazil national football team; the event took place in Miami

In the same year he was invited by the Cartoonist Maurício de Sousa to participate in Monica Parade. In commemoration of the 50th anniversary of the character Monica (Monica's Gang), the city of São Paulo wins the Urban Interventionism which exhibits 50 sculptures made of Fiberglass which are 1.60 cm high and are fixed on a 25 cm base.

However, the statue made by the artist Lobo was stolen  at dawn, less than three hours after Monica Parede's team left it at the exhibition site, at Rua Oscar Freire in Jardim Paulista. The case was under police investigation for a few days and gained prominence in the media, newspapers and news  in Brazil. After an anonymous complaint indicating that the sculpture had been abandoned in the city of Guarulhos, Mauricio de Sousa's daughter, Mônica Sousa went to the police station to rediscover the sculpture of the character inspired by herself. After a small restoration, the sculpture created by Lobo, Mônica Pop 50 was placed on Paulista Avenue, in front of the Conjunto Nacional (São Paulo) where fans and onlookers lined up and fought for the right to a photo next to Mônica.

In 2014, the artist was invited by Grupo RBS to paint live, during Marketing Network Brasil. The event was held at Hotel Transamérica, in Ilha de Comandatuba.

In 2015, Heineken completed five years in Brazil and, to commemorate the date, the brand carried out an action with the purpose of rescuing, together with employees, the main achievements of Heineken since its arrival in Brazil. Employees were invited to send their internal communications team their perceptions and suggestions. From this content, a ranking was formed with the most suggested achievements and the artist Lobo was invited to illustrate them in style on a three-meter screen that is displayed in the main office in São Paulo.

Also in 2015, the Artist participated in “Reciclalata”, a Travelling exhibition composed of fifteen cans one meter in diameter, personalized by contemporary artists from different regions of Brazil. The show was developed to commemorate the 25th anniversary of the aluminum can in Brazil.

In 2016, Viva Schin (Heineken brand), a Brasil Kirin soft drink brand, launched a line of collectible packaging  inspired by the career of presenter Xuxa. Eight “Viva Xuxa” cans were created by the Pop Artist Lobo and are sold throughout Brazil. This is the second time that Viva Schin and Lobo have joined in honor of Xuxa, who is an ambassador for the soft drink brand.

In 2017, the 10th edition of Cow Parade Brazil took place, and Lobo was invited to portray and honor one of the forty-five cities where he has already passed what is considered the most successful urban art event in the world. Inspired by the theme “a trip around the world” the statue painted by Lobo was a tribute to the city of Las Vegas (Nevada, United States) inspired by the colors, lights and some postcards of the city such as the Flamingo Las Vegas, Golden Nugget Las Vegas, Luxor Hotel, and the singer Elvis Presley among other tourist attractions.

Also in 2017, A Yázigi (English school in Brazil), the official sponsor of the Elephant Parade in São Paulo, invited Lobo to paint two elephants. Yázigi students created drawings and essays that transmitted messages to inspire three Brazilian artists in the personalization of life-size sculptures of baby elephants.

The Elephant Parade event that has passed through more than fifteen countries and the 2017 edition took place in São Paulo and featured decorated elephant sculptures scattered around the city; and Lobo was invited to paint two sculptures. The life-size sculptures of a baby elephant were auctioned off at the end of the exhibition in São Paulo and the proceeds were earmarked for local philanthropy projects and elephant preservation projects.

In 2018, the American television network Fox (Fox Broadcasting Company) invited Lobo to contribute his art to one of the sets of the series LA to Vegas. The series that debuted on the American network in January 2018, tells the story of an airline, Jackpot Airlines, its eccentric crew and passengers seen on the trip to Las Vegas; with the opportunity to return to Los Angeles as winners.

Still in 2018 Lobo is invited by the company Mercado Livre to paint murals at his new headquarters in Florianópolis. The concept of the first mural (which measures 13 meters) was inspired by Brazilian cities, mixing icons to represent countries in Latin America where the company also operates. Argentina, Peru, Uruguay, México, Ecuador, and Chile were some countries honored on the mural.

In 2019, Fraport, a German company that won the bid to manage one of the main entrance doors in Rio Grande do Sul, Porto Alegre, invites artist Lobo to paint seven murals depicting the gaucho culture. The first phase of the new Salgado Filho Airport was delivered in 2019.

Also in 2019, Lobo was invited by Mercado Livre to paint the new distribution center in Cajamar. Mercado Livre is an Argentina e-commerce company, in July 2020, it became the most valuable company in Latin America.

Technique 

Pop art is an Art movement that emerged in the 1950s in England, but which reached its maturity in the 1960s in the United States.

Lobo is known as a reference in Pop Art in Brazil and worldwide. His inspiration comes from a new wave generation, inspired by The B-52s, David Bowie, Sigue Sigue Sputnik, among others. The image of Robert Smith (singer) (The Cure) painted on the first canvas by artist Lobo is proof that music, even if indirectly, was a great influence at the beginning of his career.

Influence 

The diversity of Culture of Brazil and brazilian art, the music of the '80s (New wave music) are artistic influences that reflect in the style of pop art painted by the Pop Artist Lobo.
 
The wealth of details and the level of elaboration of his creations, we can say that his art is also influenced by Architecture, Fauna and Flora. When we look at his works in detail we see a universe of influences.

From the richness of the details of Historical Monuments, the choice of colors, to the narrative of their creations establish a connection that arouses our interest in their works. And gradually the artist Lobo is becoming one of the most important references in Pop Art.

As for his artistic influences, the great masters of pop art, Andy Warhol, Roy Lichtenstein and Keith Haring are the ones who helped define the style of the Brazilian artist.

Gallery

External links

References

Pop artists
Brazilian painters
Brazilian contemporary artists
People from São Paulo
1973 births
Living people